Project 70 Land Acquisition and Borrowing Act is a public lands acquisition law enacted in the Commonwealth of Pennsylvania on 22 June 1964. It permits the state to issue bonds for the purchase of lands for public parks, reservoirs, and other conservation, recreation, and historical preservation purposes, and to coordinate those purchases with local governments.  The act also permits acquisition of lands by eminent domain. Once the lands are acquired under Project 70, the General Assembly must approve any disposition of these lands. 

The park in northeastern Pennsylvania, ten miles north of Scranton, was known as Project 70 during its construction prior to opening under the name Lackawanna State Park.

List of state parks 
Below is a list of Pennsylvania state parks whose establishment or expansion was funded in part by Project 70 monies. The table includes the park name, if it was a new park or addition, the acres (hectares) acquired, the county or counties it is in, and the dates of the public hearing and approval by the governor.

List of county parks

References

External links 
 Environmental laws of Pennsylvania
 Issue raised in Lansford in June 2007

Real property law
Pennsylvania statutes
1964 in law
1964 in Pennsylvania